The European Federation for Medical Informatics (EFMI) is a non-profit organization, which was conceived at a meeting, assisted by the Regional Office for Europe of the World Health Organization (WHO), in Copenhagen, (Denmark, Europe), in September 1976.

Objectives
The EFMI wants to:
 advance international co-operation and dissemination of information in Medical Informatics in Europe
 promote high standards in the application of medical informatics
 promote research and development in medical informatics
 encourage high standards in education in medical informatics
 function as the autonomous European Regional Council of the International Medical Informatics Association (IMIA)

Organizations
 Working Group Medical Informatics (AKMI) of the Austrian Society for Biomedical Engineering ÖGBMT) and of the Austrian Computer Society (OCG) (Austria)
 Belgian Medical Informatics Association (Belgium)
 Society for Medical Informatics of Bosnia & Herzegovina (Bosnia-Herzegovina)
 Croatian Society for Medical Informatics (Croatia)
 The Cyprus Society of Medical Informatics (Cyprus)
 Czech Society for Biomedical Engineering and Medical Informatics (Czech Republic)
 The Danish Society for Medical Informatics (Denmark)
 Finnish Social and Health Informatics Association (FinnSHIA) (Finland)
 French Medical Informatics Association (AIM) (France)
 German Association for Medical Informatics, Biometry and Epidemiology (Germany)
 Greek Health Informatics Association (Greece)
 National Institute for Strategic Health Research (Hungary)
 Icelandic Society of Information Processing (Iceland)
 Healthcare Informatics Society of Ireland (Ireland)
 The Israeli Association for Medical Informatics (Israel)
 Italian Medical Informatics Society (AIIM) (Italy)
 State Medical and Pharmaceutical University "N. Testemitanu" (Moldova, Republic of)
 VMBI, Society for Healthcare Informatics (Netherlands)
 Norwegian Society for Medical Informatics (Norway)
 The Technical University of Lodz (Politechnika Łódzka) (Poland)
 Faculty of Medicine of Oporto University (Portugal)
 Portuguese Medical Informatics Association (E-Mais) (Portugal)
 Romanian Society of Medical Informatics (Romania)
 N. N. Burdenko Neurosurgical Institute (Russian Federation)
 Association for Medical Informatics of Serbia (Serbia)
 Slovenian Medical Informatics Association (SIMIA) (Slovenia)
 Spanish Society of Health Informatics (Spain)
 Swedish Federation for Medical Informatics (SFMI) (Sweden)
 Swiss Society for Medical Informatics (Switzerland)
 Turkish Medical Informatics Association (TurkMIA) (Turkey)
 The Ukraine Association for "Computer Medicine" (UACM) (Ukraine)
 British Computer Society Health Informatics Forum (BCSHIF) (United Kingdom)

See also
 European Institute for Health Records
 Health informatics
 Electronic Health Record (EHR)
 Electronic Medical Record (EMR)

References

External links
 European Federation for Medical Informatics

International medical and health organizations
Health informatics and eHealth associations
Information technology organizations based in Europe